The 2002 Wizard Home Loans Cup was the Australian Football League competition played in its entirety before the Australian Football League's 2002 Premiership Season began. The AFL National Cup is also sometimes referred to as the pre-season cup because it is played in its entirety before the Premiership Season begins. Teams were split into 4 groups, each comprising 4 teams. Each team would play the other three teams in its group once, with the winners of the four groups advancing to the semi finals. Port Adelaide won their second pre-season cup defeating Richmond in the final.

Groups

|-
! Group 1
| Hawthorn || Collingwood || Kangaroos || Sydney
|-
! Group 2
| Fremantle || Western Bulldogs || Port Adelaide || Essendon
|-
! Group 3
| Geelong || Richmond || West Coast || Carlton
|-
! Group 4
| St. Kilda || Melbourne || Brisbane || Adelaide
|-

Games

Round 1

|- bgcolor="#CCCCFF"
|Home team||Home team score||Away team||Away team score||Ground||Crowd||Date
|- bgcolor="#FFFFFF"
|  || 16.13 (109) ||  || 5.11 (41) || Colonial Stadium || 13,814 || Friday, 15 February
|- bgcolor="#FFFFFF"
|  || 13.9 (87) ||  || 10.8 (68) || Subiaco Oval || 13,304 || Friday, 15 February
|- bgcolor="#FFFFFF"
|  || 12.7 (79) ||  || 7.13 (55) || Baytec Stadium || 11,531 || Saturday, 16 February
|- bgcolor="#FFFFFF"
|  || 12.9 (81) ||  || 17.14 (116) || Optus Oval || 5,217 || Saturday, 16 February
|- bgcolor="#FFFFFF"
|  || 14.7 (91) ||  || 14.9 (93) || Gabba || 17,236 || Saturday, 16 February
|- bgcolor="#FFFFFF"
|  || 13.10 (88) ||  || 11.10 (76) || York Park || 12,861 || Sunday, 17 February
|- bgcolor="#FFFFFF"
|  || 18.11 (119) ||  || 5.9 (39) || Manuka Oval || 7,826 || Sunday, 17 February
|- bgcolor="#FFFFFF"
|  || 13.8 (86) ||  || 8.10 (58) || Football Park || 15,576 || Sunday, 17 February

Round 2

|- bgcolor="#CCCCFF"
|Home team||Home team score||Away team||Away team score||Ground||Crowd||Date
|- bgcolor="#FFFFFF"
|  || 12.8 (80) ||  || 10.11 (71) || Bundaberg Rum Stadium || 13,814 || Friday, 22 February
|- bgcolor="#FFFFFF"
|  || 7.11 (53) ||  || 11.12 (78) || Subiaco Oval || 17,646 || Friday, 22 February
|- bgcolor="#FFFFFF"
|  || 13.10 (88) ||  || 11.10 (76) || Optus Oval || 5,069 || Saturday, 23 February
|- bgcolor="#FFFFFF"
|  || 12.16 (88) ||  || 18.8 (116) || Colonial Stadium || 12,445 || Saturday, 23 February
|- bgcolor="#FFFFFF"
|  || 17.14 (116) ||  || 7.8 (50) || Football Park || 10,234 || Saturday, 23 February
|- bgcolor="#FFFFFF"
|  || 16.8 (104) ||  || 11.17 (83) || Manuka Oval || 7,826 || Sunday, 24 February
|- bgcolor="#FFFFFF"
|  || 17.11 (113) ||  || 11.11 (77) || Football Park || 14,351 || Sunday, 24 February
|- bgcolor="#FFFFFF"
|  || 12.13 (85) ||  || 10.8 (68) || Colonial Stadium || 13,795 || Sunday, 24 February

Round 3

|- bgcolor="#CCCCFF"
|Home team||Home team score||Away team||Away team score||Ground||Crowd||Date
|- bgcolor="#FFFFFF"
|  || 14.13 (97) ||  || 10.11 (71) ||  Colonial Stadium || 16,375 || Friday, 1 March
|- bgcolor="#FFFFFF"
|  || 14.14 (98) ||  || 12.12 (84) || Subiaco Oval || 13,049 || Friday, 1 March
|- bgcolor="#FFFFFF"
|  || 10.12 (72) ||  || 16.17 (113) || Colonial Stadium || 5,391 || Saturday, 2 March
|- bgcolor="#FFFFFF"
|  || 17.6 (108) ||  || 7.11 (53) || Gabba || 13,025 || Saturday, 2 March
|- bgcolor="#FFFFFF"
|  || 13.10 (88) ||  || 8.7 (55) || Subiaco Oval || 11,228 || Saturday, 2 March
|- bgcolor="#FFFFFF"
|  || 8.9 (57) ||  || 15.9 (99) || Optus Oval || 4,208 || Sunday, 3 March
|- bgcolor="#FFFFFF"
|  || 22.10 (142) ||  || 4.11 (35) || Football Park || 16,122 || Sunday, 3 March
|- bgcolor="#FFFFFF"
|  || 9.13 (67) ||  || 19.13 (127) || Colonial Stadium || 11,455 || Sunday, 3 March

Ladders

Group 1

Group 2

Group 3

Group 4

Semi finals

|- bgcolor="#CCCCFF"
|Home team||Home team score||Away team||Away team score||Ground||Crowd||Date
|- bgcolor="#FFFFFF"
|  || 16.11 (107) ||  || 9.14 (68) ||  Colonial Stadium || 11,265 || Friday, 8 March
|- bgcolor="#FFFFFF"
|  || 13.6 (84) ||  || 10.10 (70) || Football Park || 14,162 || Saturday, 9 March

Final

See also

List of Australian Football League night premiers
2002 AFL season

References

Australian Football League pre-season competition
Wizard Cup